Space Jam: A New Legacy (Original Motion Picture Soundtrack) is the soundtrack album to the 2021  live-action/animated sports comedy film Space Jam: A New Legacy produced by Warner Animation Group and distributed by Warner Bros. Pictures. It was released on July 9, 2021 by Republic Records and WaterTower Music. It featured various artists performing on the album, including Lil Baby, Kirk Franklin, Saint Jhn, SZA, John Legend, Lil Wayne, Saweetie, Jonas Brothers, 24kGoldn, Lil Uzi Vert, Chance the Rapper, Joyner Lucas, Big Freedia, G-Eazy, and Kash Doll.

Two lead singles were released, prior to the soundtrack, for promotional purposes. Lil Baby and Franklin's "We Win" was released as the first track on May 19, 2021, and its music video was released two months later, on July 28 (after the film's release). The video featured Baby and Franklin, while snippets from the film were also played. The song upon release was streamed by over 4.5 million listeners as of mid-June. Jhn and SZA's song "Just For Me" was released as the second single from the album on June 11.

The film's score is composed by Kris Bowers, who replaced Hans Zimmer as the composer in January 2021. WaterTower Music released the original score album on July 16, 2021, coinciding with the film's theatrical and premium video-on-demand streaming release via HBO Max.

Background 
Kier Lehman and Morgan Rhodes served as the music supervisors. They wanted "songs that were fun as we ushered in a new generation, that would help move the excitement as the game moves to give a nod to what came before", which resulted in a soundtrack featuring prominent artists. Speaking to Variety, both Rhodes and Lehman said "We both loved the original soundtrack, but I don’t know that we necessarily felt pressure. We were just so excited to continue what had been started. Music has changed, but we have an opportunity to showcase the natural sound of music, as well as bringing in artists who were on the first soundtrack."

In an interview to Billboard, Spencer Beighley, head of film at SpringHill stated that the film's music was consistent over the scripting process, as "When you think about the original soundtrack, it’s such a melting pot [...] You have Quad City DJ's, you have a Steve Miller Band cover, you have a six-minute D’Angelo track, and it transcended the movie, in a way. So we knew that with the soundtrack for this one, that whole idea of making a soundtrack for this generation, but still having that melting pot, was something we all really wanted." Republic Records A&R representative, Sammie Taylor, wanted a "cross generational soundtrack that appeals for all ages, similar to the first film soundtrack", which she confessed it as the "hardest part". Salt-N-Pepa, which recorded "Upside Down (‘Round-N-‘Round)" for the first film, collaborated with Saweetie and Kash Doll for the track "Hoops", thereby becoming the first artist to feature on both soundtracks.

Track listing

Additional music 
2 Unlimited's "Get Ready for This", one of the songs from the first film, is briefly heard in one scene with Al-G and Dom. "Sirius", an instrumental song by Alan Parsons Project that serves as the entrance anthem for the Chicago Bulls, is heard briefly when Sylvester brings out Michael B. Jordan to the Tune Squad, who believe that its the basketball player Michael Jordan even though he isn't.

Reception 
The soundtrack received mostly negative response from critics. Pitchfork's Alphonse Pierre called the soundtrack as "soulless and gratuitous" as the film and gave 2.3/10 to the album. Rolling Stone-based Jayson Buford gave one-and-a-half out of five, wrote "Nobody who writes about this soundtrack wants it to be bad, but something for kids shouldn’t be this manufactured. The messages in pop culture for kids can inform a new generation and create memories that are passed down to the next generations. Or, it can just be plain old fun. Instead, this movie is stale and the soundtrack is worse." The Ringer's Justin Charity stated "The sequel was always going to be craven and stupid. But the musicians might have once again seized the opportunity to help make this children’s movie feel bigger than it ought to be. Yet the movie and the soundtrack both feel small, and the latter almost sounds determined to be forgotten by all but the algorithm as soon as it’s possible." Soul In Stereo, in a positive note, wrote "Like the film its promotes, his soundtrack too often feels like a nostalgic cash in, and most of the artists here don’t seem all that interested themselves. but a soundtrack promoting a kids movie – us old heads may be bored to tears, but younger fans will have a ball, fueling nostalgic memories for years to come."

References 

2021 soundtrack albums
Pop soundtracks
Gospel albums
Hip hop soundtracks
Jazz soundtracks
Rhythm and blues soundtracks
WaterTower Music soundtracks
Republic Records soundtracks
Various artists albums
Space Jam